The 1953–54 Irish Cup was the 74th edition of the premier knock-out cup competition in Northern Irish football. 

Derry City won the cup for the 2nd time, defeating Glentoran 1–0 in the second final replay at Windsor Park after the previous two matches ended in draws. 

Linfield were the holders but they were defeated 2-1 by Derry in the semi-final replay.

Results

First round

|}

Replay

|}

Quarter-finals

|}

Replay

|}

Semi-finals

|}

Replay

|}

Final

Replay

Second replay

References

External links
The Rec.Sport.Soccer Statistics Foundation - Northern Ireland - Cup Finals

Irish Cup seasons
1953–54 in Northern Ireland association football
1953–54 domestic association football cups